Schwiers is a surname. Notable people with the surname include:

Ellen Schwiers (1930–2019), German actress
Jasmin Schwiers (born 1982), German actress

See also
Schweers